Scott Field Historic District began as a World War I era air base built in 1917 near O'Fallon, Illinois, and was expanded and rebuilt before World War II.  The district contains primarily that portion of the base built prior to 1941, and is now contained within the renamed, expanded, and operational Scott Air Force Base.  The district boundaries include 107 contributing buildings and structures, and exclude post-1945 buildings built in the areas surrounding the 1917 Main Base area.

Scott Field was named after Corporal Frank S. Scott, the first enlisted member of the United States Armed Forces to die in an aircraft accident.

The district was listed on the National Register of Historic Places in 1994.

See also
21st Airship Group

References

External links

  Scott AFB
 
 

National Register of Historic Places in St. Clair County, Illinois
1917 establishments in Illinois
Military facilities on the National Register of Historic Places in Illinois
Historic districts on the National Register of Historic Places in Illinois